Ompok is a genus of fish in the family Siluridae found in lakes and large rivers throughout South and Southeast Asia.

Taxonomy
The genus is recognized to be paraphyletic. The species of Ompok have been grouped into species groups, such as the Ompok bimaculatus group (i.e. O. bimaculatus, O. malabaricus and O. miostoma), the O. eugeneiatus group (i.e. O. eugeneiatus and O. pinnatus), the O. hypophthalmus group (i.e. O. hypophthalmus, O. rhabdinurus and O. urbaini) and the O. leiacanthus group (O. fumidus, O. jaynei and O. leiacanthus). On the other hand, the monophyly of these species groups is not strong enough to reassign species to other genera.

The O. eugeneiatus group is likely to be more closely related to Kryptopterus than the other Ompok species. According to Ferraris O. eugeneiatus has been reclassified into Kryptopterus, however O. pinnatus has not.

Species
There are currently 27 recognized species in this genus:
 Ompok argestes Sudasinghe & Meegaskumbura, 2016 
 Ompok bimaculatus (Bloch, 1794) (Butter catfish)
 Ompok binotatus H. H. Ng, 2002
 Ompok borneensis (Steindachner, 1901)
 Ompok brevirictus H. H. Ng & Hadiaty, 2009
 Ompok canio (F. Hamilton, 1822)
 Ompok ceylonensis (Günther, 1864) 
 Ompok eugeneiatus (Vaillant, 1893)
 Ompok fumidus T. H. T. Tan & P. K. L. Ng, 1996
 Ompok hypophthalmus (Bleeker, 1846)
 Ompok javanensis (Hardenberg, 1938)
 Ompok jaynei Fowler, 1905
 Ompok karunkodu H. H. Ng, 2013 
 Ompok leiacanthus (Bleeker, 1853)
 Ompok malabaricus (Valenciennes, 1840)
 Ompok miostoma Vaillant, 1902
 Ompok pabda (F. Hamilton, 1822) 
 Ompok pabo (F. Hamilton, 1822) 
 Ompok pinnatus H. H. Ng, 2003 
 Ompok platyrhynchus H. H. Ng & H. H. Tan, 2004
 Ompok pluriradiatus H. H. Ng, 2002
 Ompok rhadinurus H. H. Ng, 2003
 Ompok sabanus Inger & P. K. Chin, 1959
 Ompok siluroides Lacépède, 1803
 Ompok supernus H. H. Ng, 2008 
 Ompok urbaini (P. W. Fang & Chaux, 1949)
 Ompok weberi (Hardenberg, 1936)

References

Siluridae
Fish of South Asia
Fish of Southeast Asia
Taxa named by Bernard Germain de Lacépède
Freshwater fish genera
Catfish genera